Fike is a surname. Notable people with the surname include:

A. J. Fike (born 1980), American racing driver
Aaron Fike (born 1982), American racing driver
Dan Fike (born 1961), American football player
Edward Fike (born 1925), American politician
Dominic Fike (born 1995), American singer and rapper